Music of England may refer to:

English folk music
Music in Medieval England
English art song

See also
:Category:Classical music in England
Music of the United Kingdom
British popular music
British rock music
British pop music
Early music of the British Isles
Baroque music of the British Isles
Early British popular music